Carlos Adrián Morales Higuera (born 6 September 1979) is a Mexican former professional footballer. He last played for Lobos BUAP on loan from Morelia in Liga MX.

A versatile midfielder and accurate set-piece taker, Carlos can play as a central midfielder, winger, wing-back and  full-back. He began his career by debuting with Mexico's Ascenso MX La Piedad (based on the city in the Mexican State of Michoacán) (1997-'98), then was brought forth to Liga MX by Morelia (1998–2001, 2002–2004, 2012), later on he would move to Pachuca (2001–2002), Tigres (2003–2006), Toluca (2006–2009), Tecos (2009) and Santos Laguna (2010-2012).

Carlos is the brother of Ramón Morales, a former footballer.

Honours
Morelia
Primera División: Invierno 2000
Copa MX: Apertura 2013
Supercopa MX: 2014

Tigres UANL
InterLiga: 2005, 2006

Pachuca
Primera División: Invierno 2001

Toluca
Primera División: Apertura 2008

Santos Laguna
Primera División: Clausura 2012

References

External links
 

1979 births
Living people
Mexico under-20 international footballers
Mexico international footballers
2001 Copa América players
2005 CONCACAF Gold Cup players
Liga MX players
Atlético Morelia players
C.F. Pachuca players
Tigres UANL footballers
Deportivo Toluca F.C. players
Tecos F.C. footballers
Santos Laguna footballers
People from La Piedad
Footballers from Michoacán
Mexican footballers
Association football midfielders